Kahleberg may refer to:

 Kahleberg, a mountain in the Ore Mountains, Germany
 Lysý vrch, a mountain in the Jizera Mountains on the Czech/Polish border
 Boreč (mountain), a mountain in the Bohemian Central Uplands, the Czech Republic
 Łysa Wyspa, a Polish island in the Neuwarper See, a bay of the Stettin Lagoon
 Kahleberg, a cargo ship of the Type RO 15